Langanesbyggð is a municipality in northeastern Iceland, just north of Eastern Region. The main village is Þórshöfn, in the north there is the Langanes peninsula.

References 

Municipalities of Iceland
Northeastern Region (Iceland)